The 2000 Chinese census, officially the Fifth National Population Census of the People's Republic of China, was conducted by the government of the People's Republic of China with 1 November 2000 as its zero hour. The total population was calculated as 1,295,330,000. The census also covered population growth, number of households, sex, age, ethnicity, educational attainment, and urban and rural population.

The census did not include the special administrative regions of Hong Kong and Macau.

Population by province-level division

Based on the results of the Fifth National Population Census, Henan was the most populous province-level division, Shandong was ranked second, Guangdong and Sichuan were third and fourth, and Jiangsu, Hebei, Hunan, Hubei, Anhui, and Zhejiang were ranked fifth through tenth. Hainan, Ningxia, Qinghai, and Tibet were the four least populous, with fewer than 10 million people each. Tibet was the least populous of all, with 2,620,000 people.

There were nine province-level divisions with more than 50 million people, eighteen with 10–50 million people, and four with less than 10 million people.

More than 50 million
Henan Province and Shandong Province had more than 90 million people.
Guangdong Province and Sichuan Province had more than 80 million people.
Jiangsu Province had more than 70 million people.
Hebei Province, Hunan Province, and Hubei Province had more than 60 million people.
Anhui Province had more than 50 million people.

10–50 million
Zhejiang Province, Guangxi Zhuang Autonomous Region, Yunnan Province, Liaoning Province, and Jiangxi Province  had more than 40 million people.
Heilongjiang Province, Shaanxi Province, Guizhou Province, Fujian Province, Shanxi Province, and Chongqing Municipality had more than 30 million people.
Jilin Province, Gansu Province, and Inner Mongolia Autonomous Region had more than 20 million people.
Xinjiang Uyghur Autonomous Region, Shanghai Municipality, Beijing Municipality, and Tianjin Municipality had more than 10 million people.

Less than 10 million
Hainan Province, Ningxia Hui Autonomous Region, and Qinghai Province had more than 5 million people.
Tibet Autonomous Region was the least populous province, with a population of 2,620,000.

List of province-level divisions by population

Distribution of ethnic minorities
There were four province-level divisions with an ethnic minority population of more than 10 million: in decreasing order, Guangxi, Yunnan, Guizhou, and Xinjiang. There were two more provinces, Liaoning and Hunan, with an ethnic minority population of more than 5 million. Fourteen more, including Inner Mongolia and Sichuan, had an ethnic minority population of more than 1 million. Three more (Shandong, Beijing, and Fujian) had more than 500,000, while the remaining eight had more than 100,000 each.

There were 13 province-level divisions where the proportion of ethnic minorities was higher than the national average. In Tibet and Xinjiang more than 50% of the population belonged to ethnic minorities: 93.94% in Tibet and 59.43% in Xinjiang. In Qinghai, Guangxi, Guizhou, Ningxia, and Yunnan the ethnic minority population was greater than 30%. In Inner Mongolia it was 20.83%. In Hainan, Liaoning, and Hunan it was more than 10%, and in Jilin and Gansu it was also greater than the nationwide proportion of 8.41%.

Absolute population of ethnic minorities
Guangxi, Yunnan, Guizhou, and Xinjiang had the highest numbers of ethnic minorities, more than 10 million each.
Liaoning and Hunan had more than 5 million.
Inner Mongolia and Sichuan had more than 4 million.
Hebei, Hubei, Jilin, Tibet, Qinghai, and Gansu had more than 2 million.
Chongqing, Ningxia, Heilongjiang, Hainan, Guangdong, and Henan had more than 1 million. The remaining 11 province-level divisions had an ethnic minority population of less than 1 million.

Proportion of ethnic minorities
Tibet and Xinjiang had the highest concentration of ethnic minorities, representing 94.07％ and 59.39％ of the population respectively, followed by Qinghai where they were 45.51％ of the population.
Guangxi, Guizhou, Ningxia, and Yunnan had more than 30％ ethnic minorities.
Inner Mongolia's population was 20.76％ minority, while Hainan, Liaoning, and Hunan were over 10％.
Jilin, Gansu, Chongqing, and Heilongjiang were over 5％.
Sichuan, Hubei, Hebei, and Beijing were over 4％.
Tianjin, Fujian, Guangdong, and Henan were between 1% and 3%, while the remaining eight province-level divisions were less than 1% ethnic minority.

List of regions and ethnic minority population

Ethnicity
The Han Chinese population had increased by 11.22% since the 1990 census, going from 91.96% of the population to 91.59%. The ethnic minority population had increased by 16.70% since the 1990 census, going from 8.04% of the population to 8.41%. The ethnic minority population grew at a higher rate than the Han population due to affirmative action under the one-child policy.

After Han, the second most populous ethnic group was the Zhuang, followed by the Manchus, each of which had more than 10 million people, and the Hui with 9,817,000 people. There were more than 8 million Miao, Uyghurs, and Tujia; 7,762,000 Yi; more than 5 million Mongols and Tibetans; more than 1 million but less than 3 million of each of nine ethnic groups including the Buyi, Dong, Koreans, and Kazakhs; more than 100,000 but less than 1 million of each of 17 ethnic groups including the She, Lisu, and Kyrgyz; and more than 10,000 but less than 100,000 of each of 13 ethnic groups including the Blang and Tajiks. Seven other ethnic groups, including the Moinba, Oroqen, and Drung, had a population of less than 10,000 each; among them, the Tatars, Hezhe, indigenous Taiwanese, and Lhoba had less than 50,000 each. The least populous ethnic group was the Lhoba, with only 2,965 people. There were 734,438 people belonging to unrecognized ethnic groups, including 710,486 in Guizhou (96.74% of the total), 7,404 in Yunnan (1.01%), and more than 1,000 in each of Tibet, Zhejiang, Guangdong, Guangxi, and Jiangsu.

Key indices

Population growth
The population had increased by 132,150,000 (11.66%) over the population of 1,133,680,000 from the Fourth National Census on 1 July 1990. The average rate of population growth per year was 1.07%.

Households
There were 348,370,000 households, with 1,198,390,000 people. The average household size was 3.44 people, a decrease of 0.52 from the 1990 average household size of 3.96.

Sex
There were 653,550,000 males (51.63% of the population) and 612,280,000 females (48.37%). The sex ratio was 106.74 men for every 100 women.

Age
There were 289,790,000 children aged 0-14, representing 22.89% of the population; 887,930,000 people aged 15–64, representing 70.15% of the population; and 88,110,000 people aged 65 and older, representing 6.96% of the population. The proportion of people 14 and under had decreased by 4.8% since the 1990 census, and the proportion of people 65 and over had increased by 1.39%.

Educational attainment
Among the population, 45,710,000 people had attended higher education; 141,090,000 people had attended high school (including vocational high school); 429,890,000 had attended middle school; and 451,910,000 had attended elementary school. (These figures include people who completed the level of education indicated, people who failed to complete it, and current students.)

In comparison with the 1990 census, the following changes happened (per 100,000 people):
People with higher education increased from 1,422 to 3,611.
People with high school education increased from 8,039 to 11,146.
People with middle school education increased from 23,344 to 33,961.
People with only elementary school education decreased from 37,057 to 35,701.

The illiteracy rate (people age 15 and above who are unable to read or can only read very little) was 85,070,000 people. The illiteracy rate had decreased from 15.88% in 1990 to 6.72% in 2000, a decrease of 9.16 percentage points.

Urban and rural population
The urban population was 455,940,000 (36.09%), and the rural population was 807,390,000 (63.91%). The urban population had increased by 9.86% since 1990.

Analysis

The 2000 census counted people according to their hukou rather than their location of actual residence. Experts believe that it may have underestimated the proportion of the population living in urban areas.

See also
National Population Census of the People's Republic of China
Fourth National Population Census of the People's Republic of China (1990)
Sixth National Population Census of the People's Republic of China (2010)

Notes

References

External links 
 
 
 
 

2000
2000 in China
China